Varyaz is a rural locality (a village) in Staronadezhdinsky Selsoviet, Blagoveshchensky District, Bashkortostan, Russia. The population was 12 as of 2010. There are 2 streets.

Geography 
Varyaz is located 43 km northeast of Blagoveshchensk (the district's administrative centre) by road. Vladimirovka is the nearest rural locality.

References 

Rural localities in Blagoveshchensky District